Jack Morgan may refer to:

 J. P. Morgan Jr. (1867–1943), known as Jack, American banker, finance executive, and philanthropist
 Jack Morgan (footballer) (1920–2005), Australian rules footballer
 Jack Morgan (athlete) (1907–1967), New Zealand track and field athlete

 Jac Morgan, Welsh rugby union player